The 2015–16 season was West Ham Uniteds fourth campaign in the Premier League since being promoted in the 2011–12 season. It was West Ham's 20th Premier League campaign overall, their 58th appearance in the top division, and their 121st year in existence.

As well as competing in the Premier League, West Ham United took part in the FA Cup and League Cup, entering at the third round in both competitions. As a result of topping the fair play table last season, the club also qualified for this season's UEFA Europa League competition.

Slaven Bilić was the team's manager, replacing Sam Allardyce. Bilić was appointed on 9 June on a three-year contract. After Kevin Nolan left West Ham on 27 August 2015, Mark Noble was the current captain. It was their last season playing at the Boleyn Ground before moving to the Olympic Stadium for the start of the 2016–17 season. The Boleyn Ground was sold to the Galliard group in 2014. A new commemorative, first-team kit was introduced for the season inspired by the kit worn for West Ham's first season at the Boleyn Ground, the 1904–05 season.

West Ham finished the season in 7th place with 62 points, a record number for the team in the Premier League. Their top scorer was Dimitri Payet with 12 goals in all competitions.

Key events

Pre-season 
 30 January 2015: Stephen Hendrie of Hamilton Academical signs a pre-contract agreement to join West Ham on 1 July 2015.
 30 April 2015: West Ham announce Umbro as their new kit supplier from the start of the 2015–16 season after signing a five-year commercial agreement.
 30 May 2015: Birmingham City's goalkeeper Darren Randolph is signed on a free transfer effective from 1 July 2015.
 9 June 2015: West Ham appoint former Hammers defender, Slaven Bilić as manager on a three-year contract.
 10 June 2015: West Ham announce the signing of Sampdoria midfielder Pedro Obiang for an undisclosed fee on a four-year deal.
 17 June 2015: The fixtures for the season are announced with last game ever to be played at the Boleyn Ground scheduled to be against Swansea City.
 20 June 2015: West Ham give a two-year contract to former Manchester City trainee Martin Samuelsen.
 26 June 2015: West Ham sign France international midfielder Dimitri Payet from Marseille on a five-year contract in an undisclosed deal worth more than £10 million.
 29 June 2015: West Ham legendary former full-back Julian Dicks joins the club's coaching staff.

Season

July 

 2 July 2015: New West Ham manager Slaven Bilić does not take charge of the team for their opening Europa League qualifier leaving coaching duties to Academy coach, Terry Westley. West Ham won the game against Lusitanos 3–0 with two goals from Diafra Sakho and one from James Tomkins.
 2 July 2015: 16 year-old development side player, Reece Oxford, plays against Lusitanos to become West Ham's youngest ever player.
 10 July 2015: West Ham complete the signing of Juventus and Italy centre-back Angelo Ogbonna for €11 million.
 14 July 2015: Defender Carl Jenkinson, signed on-loan in the 2014–15 season, returns for a 12-month loan from Arsenal.
 16 July 2015: Winger Stewart Downing rejoins hometown club Middlesbrough on a four-year deal, stepping down a division from West Ham.
 22 July 2015: West Ham sign former River Plate attacking midfielder Manuel Lanzini, known as "the jewel." He joined on a year-long loan from United Arab Emirates side Al Jazira with the option to make the move permanent.

August 
 6 August 2015: West Ham are knocked out of the Europa League in the third qualifying round by Romanian side, Astra Giurgiu 4–3 on aggregate.
 9 August 2015: The Premier League season begins for West Ham with a 0–2 win against Arsenal at Emirates Stadium.
 19 August 2015: West Ham United midfielder Diego Poyet joins Championship side Milton Keynes Dons on loan until the end of the season
 20 August 2015: West Ham United centre-back Reece Burke joined League One side Bradford City on Youth Loan for an initial period until 20 September 2015.
 23 August 2015: Striker Diafra Sakho is arrested and bailed on suspicion of making threats to kill and witness intimidation.
 27 August 2015: Midfielder Kevin Nolan leaves by mutual consent.
 28 August 2015: Striker Modibo Maïga joins Saudi Arabian club Al Nassr on a permanent basis for an undisclosed fee.
 29 August 2015: With the 0–3 victory at Liverpool, West Ham win their first league match at Anfield since 1963.

September 
 1 September 2015: Barcelona midfielder Alex Song and Chelsea winger Victor Moses sign on season-long loans, with Hull City striker Nikica Jelavić also arriving for approximately £3 million on an initial two-year contract with an option for a further two years. Winger Michail Antonio signs from Nottingham Forest on a four-year contract, with an option for a further two years. Midfielder Matt Jarvis joins Norwich City on a season-long loan.
 18 September 2015: Bradford City extend defender Reece Burke's loan stay at Valley Parade for a further month.

October 
 6 October 2015: Morgan Amalfitano is released by the club.
 24 October 2015: West Ham defeat reigning Premier League champions Chelsea 2–1 at the Boleyn Ground with goals from Mauro Zárate and Andy Carroll.

November 
 10 November 2015: Midfielder Dimitri Payet suffered an injury to his left ankle during game with Everton. He was ruled out of action for three months. Payet picked up the injury following a crude challenge from Everton midfielder James McCarthy.
 24 November 2015: Blackburn Rovers re-sign defender Doneil Henry on loan from West Ham United until 3 January.
 25 November 2015: League One's Bradford City extend defender Reece Burke's youth loan deal from West Ham until 2 January.

December 
 4 December 2015: West Ham striker Diafra Sakho is set to be sidelined for three months with a thigh injury. Sakho suffered the injury against West Bromwich Albion and an examination has confirmed the extent of the problem.
 8 December 2015: West Ham midfielder Manuel Lanzini could be out for up to six weeks with a thigh injury. The Argentine suffered the problem in training before a 0–0 draw at Manchester United.
 10 December 2015: West Ham move to their new training ground months ahead of schedule to combat a growing injury list. The Rush Green site is unfinished but the pitches are in use. They will train there from 14 December. Due to relocate to their new Rush Green HQ at the start of next season, manager Slaven Bilić said they "can't continue to risk" using the pitches at their Chadwell Heath base. Winston Reid and Victor Moses join Dimitri Payet, Sakho and Lanzini on the sidelines.  Reid and Moses are facing up to six weeks out with hamstring problems. Reid was injured during training, while Moses suffered his injury in a goalless draw at Manchester United.
 24 December 2015: Winger Matt Jarvis signs a permanent deal with Norwich, to take effect in the January transfer window, for a reported fee of £2.5 million, having joined Norwich on loan in September.

January 

 2 January 2016: With a 2–0 home win West Ham complete their first league double over Liverpool for 52 years.
 10 January 2016: Manuel Lanzini out for six weeks after the recurrence of a thigh injury. He was hurt in the 2–0 win over Liverpool on 2 January.
 14 January 2016: Andy Carroll is ruled out for up to six weeks with a hamstring injury. He was substituted after 15 minutes in the Hammers' 3–1 win at AFC Bournemouth on 12 January.
 20 January 2016: West Ham sign full-back Sam Byram from Leeds United for an undisclosed fee. He had been in talks with Everton, but instead signed a four-and-a-half-year deal with the Hammers.
 21 January 2016: Striker Mauro Zárate moves to Italian club Fiorentina.

February 

 9 February: Angelo Ogbonna scores his first goal for the club, an added-time winner against Liverpool in the fourth round of the FA Cup.
 16 February: Forward, Nikica Jelavić signs for Chinese side Beijing Rehne.
 21 February: West Ham reach the sixth round of the FA Cup after beating Blackburn Rovers 5–1 at Ewood Park with goals from Victor Moses, two from Dimitri Payet and two from Emmanuel Emenike, his first for the club.
 27 February: Former manager Sam Allardyce returns to the Boleyn Ground for the first time with his Sunderland side. A single goal by Michail Antonio wins the game for West Ham.

March 
 2 March: West Ham beat London rivals Tottenham Hotspur 1–0 with a goal from Michail Antonio. The Champions Statue is boarded-up for protection and the match is marred by violence between the two sets of supporters with clashes on Green Street.

April 

 9 April: Andy Carroll scores a hat-trick in eight minutes in a 3–3 home draw with Arsenal, his first for the club.
 13 April: West Ham exit the FA Cup after being beaten 2–1 by Manchester United.
 20 April: Carroll scores in three consecutive Premier League games for the first time in his career as West Ham beat Watford 3–1. West Ham set a record 15 games undefeated in the Premier League with the win.
 22 April: Valencia striker Toni Martínez signs for West Ham on a three-year contract.
 30 April: With a 3–0 win at West Brom, West Ham reach a record Premier League points total of 59.

May 
 4 May: The Development Squad win the 2015–16 Under-21 Premier League Cup after defeating Hull City 5–3 in a penalty shoot-out.
 10 May: West Ham win their last home game at the Boleyn Ground against Manchester United 3–2, with Winston Reid scoring the last goal at the ground.

Squad

First team squad 
On 30 July 2015, West Ham announced new squad numbers for the 2015–16 season.

Squad statistics

Goalscorers

Coaching staff 

{| class="wikitable"
|Manager ||  Slaven Bilić
|-
|Assistant manager ||  Nikola Jurčević
|-
|First team coach ||  Julian Dicks
|-
|First team coach ||  Edin Terzić
|-
|Goalkeeping coach ||   Chris Woods
|-
|Development coach||  Steve Potts
|-
|Fitness coach ||  Eamon Swift
|-
|Fitness coach ||  Miljenko Rak
|- 	
|Club Ambassador ||  Tony Carr MBE
|-
|Academy Manager & Head of Coaching and Player Development  ||  Terry Westley
|-
|Head of Medical & Sports Science||   Stijn Vandenbroucke
|-
|Head Physiotherapist||  Dominic Rogan
|-
|Chief Scout & Director of Recruitment||  Tony Henry

Pre-season 

On 6 June 2015, West Ham announced their pre-season friendlies. Two days later, the club confirmed a further two friendlies. On 26 June 2015, the Hammers confirmed they would host Werder Bremen on 2 August 2015.

Competitions

Premier League

Matches 
On 17 June 2015, the fixtures for the forthcoming season were announced.

League table

Results summary

Results by matchday

Football League Cup 

West Ham did not enter until the third round along with the seven other teams who qualified for European competition.
They were Manchester City, Arsenal, Manchester United, Tottenham, Liverpool, Southampton and Chelsea.

FA Cup

UEFA Europa League 

On 22 June 2015, the first qualifying round for the 2015–16 UEFA Europa League was announced, West Ham United were drawn against Andorran side Lusitanos. On 9 July 2015, the final lineup of the second qualifying round was confirmed with West Ham drawn against Maltese side Birkirkara. On 6 August 2015, West Ham were knocked out of the Europa League in the third qualifying round following a 2–1 defeat by Romanian side Astra Giurgiu to lose 4–3 on aggregate.

First qualifying round

Second qualifying round

Third qualifying round

New contracts

Transfers

Summer

In

Out

Under-21s

2015–16 U21 Premier League

Squad

Development squad

Trialists who made U21 appearances

References

External links 
 West Ham United FC Official Website

West Ham United
West Ham United F.C. seasons
West Ham United
West Ham United
West Ham United